Who Killed Bambi? may refer to:

 "Who Killed Bambi?" (song), 1980 song  by Ten Pole Tudor with Sex Pistols
 Who Killed Bambi? (unfinished film), a film featuring the Sex Pistols, due to be released in 1978
 Who Killed Bambi? (2003 film), French film
 Who Killed Bambi? (2013 film), Spanish film
 Vem dödade bambi?, 2019 Finland-Swedish novel by Monika Fagerholm